Peebles was a royal burgh that returned one commissioner to the Parliament of Scotland and to the Convention of Estates.

After the Acts of Union 1707, Peebles, Lanark, Linlithgow and Selkirk formed the Lanark district of burghs, returning one member between them to the House of Commons of Great Britain.

List of burgh commissioners

 1661–83, 1665 convention, 1667 convention: Alexander Williamson, provost 
 1669–70: John Plenderleith 
 1672–74: Alexander Williamson  
 1681–82: William Williamson, town clerk 
 1678: Gawin Thompson, provost 
 1689–1702: John Muir, merchant burgess  
 1702–07: Archibald Shiells, provost

See also
 List of constituencies in the Parliament of Scotland at the time of the Union

References

Constituencies of the Parliament of Scotland (to 1707)
Peebles
Constituencies disestablished in 1707
1707 disestablishments in Scotland